Upadrasta Ramamurty (born 1967) is an Indian engineering scientist. He holds a position as a Professor in the Department of Materials Engineering at  the Indian Institute of Science.

Background 
He has a Ph.D. (1994) from Brown University, a master's degree in Engineering (1991) from the Indian Institute of Science, and a bachelor's degree in Engineering (1989) from Andhra University.

Awards 
He was awarded in 2011 the   Shanti Swarup Bhatnagar Prize for Science and Technology, the highest science award in India,  in the engineering category. In 2015, he was awarded the TWAS Prize in the engineering category for his fundamental contributions to the understanding of deformation, fatigue and fracture in several classes of new materials.

References

Living people
Engineers from Andhra Pradesh
Recipients of the Shanti Swarup Bhatnagar Award in Engineering Science
1967 births
People from West Godavari district
Indian Institute of Science alumni
20th-century Indian engineers
Indian materials scientists
TWAS laureates
Brown University School of Engineering alumni